Ove Gunnarsson (22 January 1946 – 30 May 1994) was a Swedish sports shooter. He competed at the 1976, 1980 and the 1984 Summer Olympics.

References

External links
 

1946 births
1994 deaths
Swedish male sport shooters
Olympic shooters of Sweden
Shooters at the 1976 Summer Olympics
Shooters at the 1980 Summer Olympics
Shooters at the 1984 Summer Olympics
People from Nordmaling Municipality
Sportspeople from Västerbotten County